WOW Hits 2012 is a two-disc compilation album composed of some of the biggest hits on Christian radio in 2011. This disc features 33 songs (39 on the deluxe edition). , the WOW series, of which this release is a part, has sold 17 million copies.

The album reached No. 1 on the  Christian Albums chart,  and No. 35 on the Billboard 200. It also reached No. 2 on the Billboard year-end Christian chart.  As of June 2012, the album has sold 284,000 copies.

Track listing

Charts

Weekly charts

Year-end charts

References

External links
 

2011 compilation albums
2012